The 1942 NAIA basketball tournament was held in March at Municipal Auditorium in Kansas City, Missouri. The 6th annual NAIA basketball tournament featured 32 teams playing in a single-elimination format.

The championship game featured Hamline beating Southeastern State (OK), 33–31.

Awards and honors
Many of the records set by the 1942 tournament have been broken, and many of the awards were established much later:
Leading scorer est. 1963
Leading rebounder est. 1963
Charles Stevenson Hustle Award est. 1958
Coach of the Year est. 1954
Player of the Year est. 1994

Bracket

  * denotes overtime.

See also
 1942 NCAA basketball tournament
 1942 National Invitation Tournament

References

NAIA Men's Basketball Championship
Tournament
1942 in sports in Missouri